"Good Intent" is a song by New Zealand singer/guitarist Kimbra from her debut studio album, Vows (2011). The song was released in New Zealand and Australia on 15 August 2011 as the third single from the album. The single peaked at number 98 on the Australian Singles Chart. It also came #52 in the Triple J Hottest 100, 2011.

Background
The meaning of this song is overall when someone has good intentions that don't work out in the end and can impact the person's reputation. In this case, the good intent is being used against the person by the one singing the song.

Composition
This song is composed in the key of E♭ minor and has the BPM of 122. The song uses stereotypical jazz, scat and ska elements and is recognized as a soul, jazz, blues and indie pop song.

Music video
A music video to accompany the release of "Good Intent" was first released onto YouTube on 25 August 2011 at a total length of four minutes and thirty seconds.
The music video begins with Kimbra in a vanity mirror, dressed in black, white, and red versions of herself. And a man wearing white, black, and gray, are in a red tinted alley way. As the song begins, the three versions of Kimbra are lip syncing in the mirror. The man in the alley had three versions of himself as well, dancing by himself and with his others. Kimbra begins to sing on a stage as the other two versions of herself sing with her, and the man in the alley comes into the room with the other two of him. Each Kimbra and man get together and dance with the other people in the room until the song ends.

Track listing
 Digital download
 "Good Intent" – 3:32

Credits and personnel
Lead vocals – Kimbra
Songwriters – Kimbra Johnson, Francois Tetaz
Producers – François Tétaz
Label: Warner Bros. Records

Chart performance

Release history

References

2011 singles
2011 songs
Kimbra songs
Song recordings produced by François Tétaz
Songs written by François Tétaz
Songs written by Kimbra
Warner Records singles
Soul songs